The Leica L-Mount is a bayonet mount developed by Leica Camera AG for interchangeable-lens autofocus digital cameras.

The L-Mount has an inner diameter of 51.6 mm and a flange depth of 20.0 mm.
The L-mount exists in two versions, an APS-C version (TL) and a full-frame version (SL). The two versions are mechanically and electronically compatible. TL lenses mounted on full-frame cameras will cause the camera to use a crop mode from the center of the sensor, corresponding to the APS-C coverage of the lens. SL lenses mounted on TL cameras function normally, providing a 1.5x crop field of view, as is typical with APS-C cameras.

In 2018 Leica formed the L-Mount Alliance, licensing Sigma, Panasonic in the same year, and DJI in 2022, to use an upgraded version of the mount for their own products, opening the way for a more extensive system of fully compatible cameras and lenses.

T-Mount to L-Mount 
It was introduced in April 2014 with the Leica T (Typ 701) camera. At the time of introduction, it was called the "T-mount", but this was changed to "L-mount" with the release of the Leica SL, a full-frame sensor camera using the same mount.  The Leica T was renamed to the Leica TL at this time, to permit marketing clarity for the L-mount lens line: TL lenses would cover APS-C sensors, while SL lenses would cover full-frame sensors.

The mount is used by the Leica TL (discontinued), TL2, Leica CL (2017) and Leica SL systems. The L-Mount is a registered trademark of Leica Camera AG.

L-Mount Alliance 

On 25 September 2018, the L-Mount Alliance between Leica, Panasonic and Sigma was announced, enabling the partners "to make use of the L-Mount standard developed by Leica for their own developments and to offer both cameras and lenses utilising this lens mount" with full compatibility between the three companies' products.

According to Sigma CEO, Kazuto Yamaki, the "L-mount system is not exactly the same as the existing one. We updated it a little bit to work better with such lenses through lens adapters."

On the same day, Panasonic announced its S1R and S1 full-frame L-Mount cameras and three L-Mount lenses, with seven more lenses to be launched by 2020.

Sigma announced that it will launch a full-frame camera in 2019, using the L-Mount and the company's Foveon sensor, as well as a range of L-mount lenses and adapters for Sigma SA and Canon EF lenses.

Six cameras and 39 native lenses are confirmed for the L-Mount by 2020.

Cameras

APS-C 
Leica T/TL cameras use APS-C sensors. The TL mount version is not dust- or splashproof.

Superseded 
 Leica T (Typ 701)
 Leica TL

Current 
 Leica TL2
 Leica CL (2017)

Full-frame 
Leica SL cameras use full-frame sensors. The SL version is dust- and splashproof.

Current 
 Leica SL (Typ 601)
 Leica SL2
 Leica SL2-S
 Panasonic S1R
 Panasonic Lumix S1
 Panasonic Lumix S1H
 Panasonic Lumix S5
 Panasonic Lumix S5II/S5IIX
 Sigma fp
 Sigma fp L

Withdrawn 
 Unspecified Foveon-based full-frame Sigma

Lenses 
Leica has an existing range of fifteen L-Mount lenses.

Panasonic committed to releasing a total of ten lenses for the L-mount by the end of 2020, beginning with the 50mm F/1.4 prime and the two zooms listed below; stating that they would provide details at Photokina 2019. 

Sigma plans to release a wide range of lenses.  14 primes from Sigma's 'Global Vision' range, primarily designed for reflex cameras with short flange depths and currently available for the mirrorless Sony E-mount, will also be released in L-Mount from 2019. These will be followed by a range designed specifically for mirrorless parameters.

APS-C

Prime 
 Leica APO-Macro-Elmarit-TL 1:2.8 / 60 ASPH
 Leica Summilux-TL 1:1.4 / 35 ASPH
 Leica Summicron-TL 1:2 / 23 ASPH
 Leica Elmarit-TL 1:2.8 / 18 ASPH
 Sigma 16mm f/1.4 DC DN Contemporary
 Sigma 30mm f/1.4 DC DN Contemporary
 Sigma 56mm f/1.4 DC DN Contemporary

Zoom 
 Leica Super-Vario-Elmar-TL 1:3.5-4.5 / 11-23 ASPH
 Leica Vario-Elmar-TL 1:3.5-5.6 / 18-56 ASPH
 Leica APO-Vario-Elmar-TL 1:3.5-4.5 / 55-135 ASPH
 Sigma 18-50 f/2.8 DC DN Contemporary

Full-frame

Prime 
 Leica Summilux-SL 1:1.4 / 50 ASPH
 Leica APO-Summicron-SL 1:2 / 75 ASPH 
 Leica APO-Summicron-SL 1:2 / 90 ASPH 
 Leica APO-Summicron-SL 1:2 / 35 ASPH
 Leica APO-Summicron-SL 1:2 / 50 ASPH
 Leica APO-Summicron-SL 1:2 / 28 ASPH
 Panasonic Lumix S 24mm f/1.8
 Panasonic Lumix S PRO 50mm f/1.4
 Panasonic Lumix S 50mm f/1.8
 Panasonic Lumix S 85mm f/1.8
 Sigma 20mm f/2 DG DN Contemporary
 Sigma 24mm f/2 DG DN Contemporary
 Sigma 24mm f/3.5 DG DN Contemporary
 Sigma 35mm f/2 DG DN Contemporary
 Sigma 45mm f/2.8 DG DN Contemporary
 Sigma 65mm f/2 DG DN Contemporary
 Sigma 90mm f/2.8 DG DN Contemporary
 Sigma 20mm f/1.4 DG DN Art
 Sigma 24mm f/1.4 DG DN Art
 Sigma 35mm f/1.2 DG DN Art
 Sigma 35mm f/1.4 DG DN Art
 Sigma 50mm f/1.4 DG DN Art
 Sigma 85mm f/1.4 DG DN Art
 Sigma 105mm f/2.8 DG DN MACRO Art
 Sigma 14mm f/1.8 DG HSM Art
 Sigma 20mm f/1.4 DG HSM Art
 Sigma 24mm f/1.4 DG HSM Art
 Sigma 28mm f/1.4 DG HSM Art
 Sigma 35mm f/1.4 DG HSM Art
 Sigma 40mm f/1.4 DG HSM Art
 Sigma 50mm f/1.4 DG HSM Art
 Sigma 70mm f/2.8 DG MACRO Art
 Sigma 85mm f/1.4 DG HSM Art
 Sigma 105mm f/1.4 DG HSM Art
 Sigma 135mm f/1.8 DG HSM Art

Zoom 
 Leica Vario-Elmarit-SL 24–70 mm 2,8 ASPH
 Leica Vario-Elmarit-SL 1:2.8-4 / 24-90 ASPH
 Leica APO-Vario-Elmarit-SL 1:2.8-4 / 90-280
 Leica Super-Vario-Elmar-SL 1:3.5-4.5 / 16-35 ASPH
 Panasonic LUMIX S PRO 16-35mm f/4
 Panasonic LUMIX S 20-60mm f/3.5-5.6 
 Panasonic LUMIX S PRO 24-70mm f/2.8
 Panasonic LUMIX S 24-105mm f/4 MACRO O.I.S. 
 Panasonic LUMIX S PRO 70-200mm f/4 O.I.S.
 Panasonic LUMIX S PRO 70-200mm f/2.8 O.I.S.
 Panasonic LUMIX S 70–300 mm 4,5-5,6 Macro OIS
 Panasonic Lumix S 14-28mm F4-5.6 Macro
 Sigma 14-24mm f/2.8 DG DN Art
 Sigma 16-28mm f2.8 DG DN Contemporary
 Sigma 24-70mm f/2.8 DG DN Art
 Sigma 28-70mm f2.8 DG DN Contemporary
 Sigma 100-400mm f/5-6.3 DG DN OS Contemporary
 Sigma 150-600 F/5-6.3 DG DN OS Sports

Third-party
Manual third-party lenses are being produced in L-mount by Irix Cine, 7Artisans (Photoelectric series), Meyer-Optik (Görlitz series), and Kipon HandeVision (IBELUX and IBERIT series').

Lens adapters 
 Leica R-Adapter L
 Leica S-Adapter L
 Leica M-Adapter L
 Leica PL-Adapter L
 Novoflex SL-EOS Adapter 
 Novoflex SL/NIK Adapter
 Sigma MC-21 SA-L
 Sigma MC-21 EF-L Sigma-manufactured 'Global Vision' EF-mount lenses are fully supported and compatible; although non-Sigma EF-mount lenses remain unguaranteed.

Notes 

Leica SL
Cameras introduced in 2015